Suzanne von Borsody (born 23 September 1957 in Munich) is a German actress.

She comes from a prominent theatre family, being the daughter of actress Rosemarie Fendel and actor Hans von Borsody. Her grandfather, Eduard von Borsody, was a famous director, while his brother, her great uncle, Julius von Borsody, was an equally famous set designer.

She may be best known internationally for playing Frau Jäger in the 1998 film Run Lola Run, and has also done dubbing work for foreign films such as Treasure Planet, where she provides the German voice of Captain Amelia.

She is a Goodwill Ambassador for UNICEF as well as for several other charity organizations.

Selected filmography
  (1988)
  (1991)
 Justice (1993)
 Lauras Entscheidung (1994, TV film)
 The Lost Daughter (1997, TV film)
 Run Lola Run (1998)
 Am I Beautiful? (1998)
  (1999, TV film)
  (2000, TV miniseries)
 Leo & Claire (2001)
 Starting Over (2007, TV film)
  (2009, TV film)
  (2011, TV film)
  (2014, TV film)

External links 
 
 Biography 

German film actresses
German television actresses
German people of Hungarian descent
Actresses from Munich
1957 births
Living people
20th-century German actresses
21st-century German actresses
German voice actresses